The Civic Democratic Party (PDP) was a liberal conservative political party in Lithuania.

External links 
 www.pdp.lt

Defunct political parties in Lithuania
Political parties established in 2006
Political parties disestablished in 2011